Lenora Champagne is an American playwright and performing artist.

Early years
As a child, Champagne wanted to be a doctor. She moved from Louisiana to New York City in the early 1970s expecting to be a painter, but took up performance art instead. She graduated with a BA in English from Louisiana State University, 1972, a MA in drama from New York University, 1975, and a PhD in performance studies from New York University, 1980.

Career
In 1981 Champagne began work as an actor and director. From 1993 to 2000, she was a member playwright at New Dramatists. In 1995 she spent time in Canada through an NEA artist's residency grant. In 2013 she taught in Japan as part of a Fulbright grant. Champagne is a professor and head of theatre and performance at Purchase College, SUNY.

Champagne frequently collaborates with sculptors, media artists and installation artists. Her live performances can be seen in galleries and arts spaces such as Franklin Furnace, the New Museum, and Creative Time's Art on the Beach. She also co-created an installation for the New Museum's Art Mall as Social Space show in 1992.

Works
Champagne is the author of one book and also a number of essays, plays and performance texts.
Out from Under: Texts by Women Performance Artists (1993) 

Plays include:

Memory's Storehouse (2011)
Photo Finish (2010)
Staying Afloat (2008)
Traces/fades (2007)
L'heure blue (2007) 
La Recherche du Pain Perdu (2006)
Mother’s Little Helper (2003) 
Memoirs of a Cajun-American Princess (2003)
The Mama Dramas (2002) 
Coaticook (2002)
Dusk (2000)
The Singing: a cyberspace opera (book and lyrics) with composer Daniel Levy (1998)
Wants solo (1997)
Wants for 3 actors (1996)
My Nebraska (1996)
Flying Home (1996)
Valentine’s Day, 1980 (1996)
The Best Things in Life solo (1993)
The Best Things in Life for 3 actors (1994)
A Tourist’s Guide to the Big Easy (1996)
Creole, a Tropical Fantasy (1993)
The Knowledge Project (1992)
With You the Rest of… (1991)
Isabella Dreams the New World (1993)
On, Say, Can You See? (1990)
Dr. Charcot’s Hysteria Shows (1988–89)
Out from Under (1989)
Women without Parts (1988)
Sarah Bernhardt Meets Her Waterloo (1987)
Fractured Tales from There to Here (1987)
Winter Heat (1987)
As Ready, Apart from Herself (1986)
Home (1986)
The Eye of the Garden (1985)
Fractured Juliet (1985–86)
From the Red Light District (1984–85)
Reptile Warmth (1984–85)
The Way to the River (1984)
Flying Home (1983–84)
Manna (1983)
Getting Over Tom (1982)
Women in Research (1981–82)

Awards
Selected awards include:
NYFA Fellowship in Performance Art in 2003 
NYFA Fellowship in Playwriting in 1998
1996 Jane Chambers Playwriting Award for Wants (for 3 actors)
1993 Native Voices/Native Visions Playwriting Award for Isabella Dreams the New World
Richard Rodgers Award from the American Academy of Arts and Letters for The Singing: a cyberspace opera

Personal life
Champagne lives in New York City's West Village with her husband, playwright and director Robert Lyons, and their daughter Amelie.

References

External links
 Website for Lenora Champagne

Living people
21st-century American writers
American musical theatre directors
American theatre managers and producers
Writers from New York City
American performance artists
20th-century American dramatists and playwrights
Year of birth missing (living people)
Fulbright alumni